

 
 
 

Bubup, or HD 38283, is a star in the southern circumpolar constellation Mensa. With an magnitude of 6.70, its invisible to the naked eye but can be seen with binoculars.

Nomelaculture 
The star was given the name "Bubup", the Boonwurrung word for "child", by the IAU, chosen by representatives of Australia for the 2019 NameExoWorlds contest.

Properties 
Bubup has a stellar classification of F9.5 V, indicating that it is an ordinary late F-type main-sequence star just shy of being a G-type main-sequence star. At present it has 137% the mass of the Sun and 149% the radius of the Sun. Unlike most planetary hosts, Bubup is metal-deficient with an iron abundance 66% that of the Sun and is older than the latter with an age of about 7 billion years.

A survey in 2015 has ruled out the existence of any stellar companions at projected distances above .

Planetary system 
On April 11, 2011, a Saturnian planet, Yanyan (HD 38283 b), was discovered in an Earth-like 363-day orbit. Yanyan itself turns out to be unable to host habitable exomoons, both because of its significant eccentricity (for the single eccentric planet solution), and because of the overluminosity of its host star compared to the Sun.

See also 
 List of extrasolar planets detected by radial velocity

References 

Mensa (constellation)
038283
026380
F-type main-sequence stars
Planetary systems with one confirmed planet
Durchmusterung objects
TIC objects